Brienz West railway station is a Swiss railway station in the municipality of Brienz and the canton of Bern. Brienz West is a stop on the Brünig line, owned by the Zentralbahn, that operates between Interlaken and Lucerne.

Services 
The following services stop at Brienz West:

References

External links 
 
 

Railway stations in the canton of Bern
Brienz
Zentralbahn stations